Pantin is a railway station in Pantin, Seine-Saint-Denis, France. It opened in 1864 on the Paris–Strasbourg railway and Paris–Mulhouse railway. Since 1999, Pantin station is served by RER line E trains operated by SNCF.

Pantin station is in Paris transport zone 2.

Train services

The station is served by the following service(s):

Paris Regional-Express (RER E): Haussmann–Saint-Lazare–Chelles–Gournay
Paris Regional-Express (RER E): Haussmann–Saint-Lazare–Tournan

Pantin served 7,500 passengers daily in 2009 and this number is expected to increase with the renovation of the Pantin mills and regeneration development of new government offices and businesses in the area.

RER E trains departs every 5–10 minutes in the direction of central Paris: Magenta for Gare du Nord and Haussmann–Saint-Lazare stations.

Connections
The bus stop for Pantin RER is located on the main roads, a short distance away from the station entrance. Bus 151 runs to Porte de Pantin metro station and the Philharmonie de Paris concert hall complex.

Night buses N13 and N140 originate from the Gare de l'Est (Paris East Railway Station). N140 stops at fewer places along the route until Pantin, then continues to Roissy-Charles de Gaulle Airport Terminal 3.
  151, 170, 249, 330
  N13, N41, N140

Gallery

See also
 List of stations of the Paris RER

References

External links

 

Réseau Express Régional stations
Railway stations in Seine-Saint-Denis
Railway stations in France opened in 1864